Origin: Spirits of the Past, known in Japan as , is a 2006 Japanese animated science fiction film directed by Keiichi Sugiyama, written by Nana Shiina and Naoko Kakimoto, and was produced by Gonzo. The film stars the voices of Ryo Katsuji, Aoi Miyazaki, Yūko Kotegawa, Masaru Hamaguchi, Toshikazu Fukawa, Kenichi Endō and Ren Osugi. It premiered in Japan in January 2006, and premiered in the United States in September 2006 at the Fantastic Fest film festival in Austin, Texas.

Plot
In the 21st century, genetic engineering to produce trees capable of growing in harsh, arid conditions have destroyed the Moon and turned Earth into a plant-strewn wasteland; Japan becomes a dystopia, covered by the Forest, a huge expanse of sapient trees that is ruled by the tree-like Druids, and controls the water supply for both trees and humans. Three centuries later, Agito, a young boy, his father Agashi, and his friends Cain and Minka, live in Neutral City, a city at the edge of the Forest carved out of ruined skyscrapers. Neutral City acts as a buffer and bridge between the Forest and the militaristic nation of Ragna, which was established in part of the empty wasteland that, as a result of the Forest's existence, now covers the rest of the planet. While the people of Neutral City work to co-exist peacefully with the trees of the Forest, Ragna aims to destroy the Forest to restore the Earth. One day, Agito and Cain race each other to see who can get to the water hole at the bottom of the city first. By disturbing the sanctity of the water hole and angering the Druids, the two boys are separated. After stumbling upon a large machine with cryogenic pods, Agito accidentally revives Toola, a young girl who has been asleep in the centuries since the plants arrived on Earth, and brings her to Neutral City

Since Toola carries a Raban, a portable personal electronic device capable of communication and a variety of other tasks, the Forest fears that Shunack, a Ragna soldier awakened from his sleep, will use her Raban to locate an environmental defragmentation system (E.S.T.O.C.) to destroy the Forest. Learning of Toola's existence, Shunack tries persuading her to join him. The Forest sends a giant plant creature to stop the meeting, but Shunack destroys it and reveals that he has been "enhanced"—he allowed himself to be genetically altered by the Forest to become stronger by using the power of the trees. Convinced that finding E.S.T.O.C. is the only way to restore the Earth back to the world that she once knew, Toola joins Shunack in his quest over Agito's objections. Agito consults his father Agashi, the founder of Neutral City who, as a result of being enhanced and having overused his powers, has turned almost completely into a tree. With few days left before becoming a tree completely, Agashi encourages his son to save the Forest from Shunack's plan, since destroying the trees, as they control the water, would mean the destruction of mankind. Agito journeys to the Forest and allows himself to be enhanced, his hair turning silver as a result.

Agito follows Shunack and Toola to E.S.T.O.C., a giant volcano converted into a mechanized, mobile weapon by Toola's father Dr. Sakul, the doctor who had begun the genetic research on the trees. A hologram of Dr. Sakul explains the story of how the research led to the world's current state, and he created E.S.T.O.C. as the best-possible safeguard against the altered trees. After betraying the Ragna army, Shunack reveals that, as one of the scientists who worked on the original genetic alteration experiments centuries ago, his impatience in speeding up the alteration process resulted in the catastrophic invasion of the mutant trees. Shunack intends to use E.S.T.O.C. to restore Earth and right the guilt that has been plaguing him ever since, and plans to activate E.S.T.O.C. near Neutral City. Realizing this, Toola unsuccessfully tries to stop Shunack from activating E.S.T.O.C. As the Ragna army commences their assault on E.S.T.O.C., Agito duels Shunack. He transforms into a tree to save Toola, absorbing Shunack into his body. Toola shuts down E.S.T.O.C., making it automatically set itself to self-destruct, but having developed strong feelings for Agito, Toola is unable to leave without him.

Meanwhile, Agito's consciousness remains intact on another plane, and there the Forest reveals to him the truth about the relationship between itself and the humans. Agito learns that the genetic admixture that gives humans extraordinary strength and eventually turns them into trees is really a two-way exchange; it also changes the Forest, causing trees to give birth to new humans in giant fruits. Having become one with the Forest, Shunack is now at peace and no longer intends to fight Agito. Realizing that Agito can teach humanity that there is no need for either hostility or separation between themselves and the trees, the Forest returns Agito to his true form, allowing him and Toola to flee E.S.T.O.C.'s destruction. With the humans and the Forest saved, Agito brings peace between humans and the trees. Toola finally lets go of her past by throwing her Raban off a ledge down into the depths of the Forest, learning to live in harmony with the trees at last.

Cast

Soundtrack

The film soundtrack was composed by Taku Iwasaki and released on January 7, 2006 by Victor Entertainment. The score was performed by the Warsaw Philharmonic Orchestra.

All pieces composed by Taku Iwasaki, except where noted.

 "Mori no Kioku"
 "Chouwa oto (With Reflection)" (Kokia)
 "Agito to Kain"
 "Doruido"
 "Toola"
 "Dai Kouzui"
 "Chuuritsu Toshi"
 "Taizai Kyoka"
 "Ragna Gun"
 Houshi Katsudou"
 "Agito to Toola 1"
 "Agashi"
 "Kako Kara Kita Otoko"
 "Sudachi"
 "Toria City"
 "Minka no Kanashimi"
 "Kikan Shinden"
 "Kyouka Karada"
 "Agito to Toola 2"
 "Chikara no Bousou"
 "Yolda no Omoi"
 "Tsuki ga Kowareta Hi"
 "Chikyuu Ryokka Project"
 "Istolk Shidou"
 "Soukougeki"
 "Istolk wo Yamero"
 "Dai Funka (Agito to Toola 3)"
 "Boku Tachi no Mirai no Tame ni"
 "Mori to Nin wo Tsunagu Mono"
 "Ai no Melody (Soundtrack Version)" (Kokia)
 "M-10a - M-10b"
 "M-21a"
 "M-21b"
 "M-23"

Reception
Anime News Network prised the animation of the film and described it as "visually and audibly, Origin is everything one has come to expect from a top-end Gonzo production: great artistry, quality animation, excellent and well-integrated CG work, and an ambitious soundtrack. It is, in fact, the most impressive-looking anime movie to come out in North America since Steamboy.

See also
 List of animated feature films
 Terraforming in popular culture

References

External links
 The Official Origin: Spirits of the Past Anime Site from FUNimation
 
 

2006 anime films
2006 science fiction films
Anime with original screenplays
Films set in the 24th century
Funimation
Gonzo (company)
Japanese animated science fiction films
MF Bunko J
Animated post-apocalyptic films
Shochiku films
Films scored by Taku Iwasaki